Translational Research Institute may refer to:

 Translational Research Institute at the Institut Pasteur Korea
 Translational Research Institute at the Scripps Research Institute
 Translational Research Institute (Australia) at the University of Queensland
 Translational Research Institute at the University of Arkansas for Medical Sciences
 Translational Research Institute at the Tufts Medical Center
 Joint Translational Research Institute at the Georgia Tech Research Institute
 Etc.

See also
 Translational research
 American Journal of Translational Research